Jigarwala is a 1991 Indian Bollywood film directed by Swaroop Kumar and produced by Surinder Kaur Jerath. It stars Tina Munim and Anil Kapoor in pivotal roles. This movie marked the final film appearance of Tina Munim. This movie also has one of the last released songs sung by Kishore Kumar, picturised on Jagdeep.

Cast
 Anil Kapoor as Amar Singh
 Tina Munim as Sohni
 Amrish Puri as Durjan Singh
 Gulshan Grover as Lakhan Singh
 Jagdeep as Shyamu
 Priti Sapru as Tara Singh
 Urmila Bhatt as Sohni's Mother
 Biswajeet as Ranjeet Singh

Soundtrack

References

External links

1990s Hindi-language films
1991 films
Films scored by Nadeem–Shravan